The Nissan H series of automobile engines is an evolution of the Nissan "R" engine which was based on the 1.5-liter, three-main bearing "G" engine used in the 1960s. Both inline-four and inline-six versions were produced. It is a pushrod OHV design with iron block, early models with an iron head, later models with aluminum head. Versions of this motor have been used in many Nissan autos and forklifts, well into the eighties and a version called H20II is still in production today. The SD diesels are based on this series of motors (bore spacing and basic block layout)

Inline-4

1H
The 1H is not related to the later H engines. It was also an all-iron, OHV engine, but this was a licensed BMC (Austin) B engine. The license agreement terminated in the late 1950s and the Nissan G engine was a more compact replacement, which in turn became replaced by the (below) Nissan H engines. The 1H would also be de-stroked from 89mm to 59mm to become the 1.0 L (990 cc) to create the Nissan C engine at the suggestion of former Willys-Overland engineer Donald Stone.  

Applications:
 1954-1959 Nissan Austin
 1956-1960 Nissan Junior B40/42

H
The basic H is a  engine produced from 1962 for Nissan's Cedric.

Applications:
 1962 Nissan Cedric 31 (high-compression)
 1962-1965 Nissan Junior 40
 1962-1965 Nissan Caball C141
 1962-1966 Nissan Echo GC141

H20
The H20 is the most-common member of the family.

Applications:
 1965-1971 Nissan Cedric 130
 1966-1970 Nissan Junior 41
 1966-1967 Nissan Caball C142
 1966-1972 Nissan Clipper T65
 1967-1976 Nissan Caball C240
 1971-1975 Nissan Cedric 230
 1971-1975 Nissan Junior 140
 1975-1982 Nissan Junior 141
 1976-1979 Nissan Cedric 330
 1979-1983 Nissan Cedric 430
 1970s Yue Loong Cedric 803 ( at 4,800 rpm)
 Nissan Caravan/Homy
 1980-1982 Nissan Urvan
Also N230S, T40, forklifts and other machinery

H20P
The H20P is the LPG-powered version of the H20.

Applications:
 1976-1979 Nissan Cedric 330
 1975-1979 Nissan Gloria 330

H25
The H25 was developed as a high-output version of the H20. This engine was used in forklifts.

 bore x stroke: .
compression ratio 8.7:1
maximum output (gross)  @ 3200 rpm
maximum torque (gross)  @ 1600 rpm

R (H16)
The R was later named H16. The "R" motor made the switch from 3 to 5 main bearings in 1967 for improved reliability, and the H20 was developed from this arrangement. The R/H16 bore and stroke is  displacing .

Applications:
 1965-1967 Nissan Bluebird R411 SSS 
 1965-1968 Nissan Silvia CSP311
 1967-1970 Datsun Sports SP311/SPL311
 1968-1972 Nissan Homer T641

U20
The U20 was similar to the H20 but with an SOHC cylinder head for motorsports applications. Although Prince Motor Company is credited in many sources with designing the U20, it was actually designed in-house at Nissan by Kenichi Sasaki. The U20 was produced in two forms: a stock  version with twin SU carburetors, or a  version with twin Mikuni/Solex carburetors and a "B" model camshaft.

Applications: 
 1967.5-1970 Datsun Sports SR311

Straight-6

K
The K engine is a  straight-6 engine produced from 1963 to 1965. The K engine is an H engine with two extra cylinders. The K engine produced .

Applications:
 1963-1965 Nissan Cedric Special 50

H30
The H30 is a  straight-6 version produced from 1965. The H30 is an H20 with two extra cylinders.

Applications:
 1965-1973 Nissan President 150 
 1973-1975 Nissan President 250
 1966-1976 Nissan C80
This engine is used in large forklifts

See also
 List of Nissan engines
 Nissan G engine

References

H
Straight-four engines
Straight-six engines
Gasoline engines by model